Haplocochlias ortizi is a species of sea snail, a marine gastropod mollusk in the family Skeneidae.

Description
The height of the shell attains 3 mm.

Distribution
This species occurs in the Caribbean Sea off Guadeloupe and Cuba at a depth between 49 m and 54 m.

References

 Espinosa, J., J. Ortea and R. Fernández-Garcés. 2005. Descripción de tres nuevas especies del género Haplocochlias Carpenter, 1864 (Mollusca: Gastropoda). Avicennia 17: 71–76.

External links

ortizi
Gastropods described in 2004